Jek may refer to:
 Jek (Quba), a village in the Quba Rayon of Azerbaijan.
 Jek Bridge, a bridge crossing the Gradaščica
 Jek language, a Northeast Caucasian language
 Jek people, an ethnic group in Azerbaijan
 Jek Porkins, a Star Wars character
 Jeri language
 Kynaston Studd (1858–1944), British cricketer, businessman and Lord Mayor of London
 Jek-14, a character the TV miniseries Lego Star Wars: The Yoda Chronicles

See also
Sharaz Jek, a Doctor Who villain
Gojek